The 1999 Pepsi 400 was a NASCAR Winston Cup Series race that took place on July 3, 1999, at Daytona International Speedway in Daytona Beach, Florida. This race would make the halfway point of the 1999 NASCAR Winston Cup Series season.

Race report
It took nearly two hours and twenty-two minutes for Dale Jarrett to defeat Dale Earnhardt under the race's final caution flag in front of a live audience of 130,000. Ricky Craven would become the last-place finisher in this 160-lap race due to a steering issue on lap 34. Mark Martin would be forced into a backup car while five drivers would fail to qualify for this race. Only Michael Waltrip, Buckshot Jones, Steve Park, and Craven would fail to finish the race. Rain would briefly occur for four laps before disappearing for the remainder of the race.

Loy Allen, Jr. would retire from NASCAR after this race. The total prize purse for this race was estimated at more than two million dollars. Winnings for this race varied from more than $160,000 for the winner and less than $36,000 for the last-place finisher.

Drivers who failed to qualify for this race are Derrike Cope, Hut Stricklin, Ken Bouchard, Robert Pressley and Stanton Barrett. Jeff Burton, Terry Labonte, Kyle Petty, Kevin Lepage, Rick Mast, Ted Musgrave and Steve Park had to use a provisional in order to qualify for the race.

Despite Rusty Wallace's average career finish of 18th place at Daytona International Speedway, Wallace would never clinch a win during his entire NASCAR Cup Series career. His best finish at Daytona would be second place at the 2002 Pepsi 400.

Stanton Barrett ran first round qualifying but withdrew before the second.

Top 10 finishers

Timeline
Section reference: 
 Start of race: Joe Nemechek has the pole position.
 Lap 34: Ricky Craven's vehicle had some problem with its steering, making him the last-place finisher.
 Lap 78: Steve Park had engine problems, forcing him out of the race.
 Lap 86: Rain began, thus delaying the race.
 Lap 89: Rain ended, allowing the cars to go back to full speed.
 Lap 110: Buckshot Jones's radiator developed problems on the track.
 Lap 113: The rear end of Michael Waltrip's vehicle became unusable, forcing him to leave the race prematurely.
 Lap 148: Caution for debris, ended after two laps.
 Lap 159: Caution for a two-vehicle accident on turn four, ended after a single lap.
 Finish: Dale Jarrett was officially declared the winner of the event.

Standings after the race

References

Pepsi 400
Pepsi 400
NASCAR races at Daytona International Speedway
July 1999 sports events in the United States